The Gun Loaded (Tofange Sarpor) is an Iranian Drama and History War series. The series is written and directed by Amrollah Ahmadjoo.

Storyline 
It is the story of a young man named Ghaybish (Hamid Reza Pegah) who lives during the First World War. During this period, due to the dictatorship of Khans, local rulers, courtiers, Qajar princes and occupying foreigners, the days of the people are going through hardships and darkness. However, people are trying to maintain their reputation and their lives.

Cast 
 Hamid Reza Pegah
 Khosrow Shakibai
 Zhaleh Olov
 Anoushirvan Arjmand
 Fathali Oveisi
 Hushang Harirchiyan
 Parvin Soleimani
 Abbas Amiri Moghaddam
 Atash Taqipour
 Mina Jafarzadeh
 Ferdous Kaviani
 Manoochehr Azar
 Sadreddin Hejazi
 Shahin Alizadeh
 Mahbubeh Bayat
 Mohammad Fili
 Mohsen Ghassabian
 Parviz Shahinkhou
 Khosro dastgerdi
 Mehri Mehrnia
 Mostafa tari

Awards and nominations

References

External links
 

Iranian television series
2000s Iranian television series